Pomphorhynchidae is a family of parasitic worms from the order Echinorhynchida.

Species
Pomphorhynchidae has five genera which contain the following species:

Longicollum Yamaguti, 1935
Longicollum alemniscus (Harada, 1935)
Longicollum cadenati Gupta & Naqvi, 1984
Longicollum chabanaudi Dollfus & Golvan, 1963
Longicollum dattai Saxena, Johri & Gupta, 2008
Longicollum edmondsi Golvan, 1969
Longicollum engraulisi Gupta & Fatma, 1985
Longicollum indicum Gupta & Gupta, 1970
Longicollum lutjani Jain & Gupta, 1980
Longicollum noellae Golvan, 1969
Longicollum pagrosomi Yamaguti, 1935

L. pagrosomi was found parasitizing the Atlantic horse mackerel (Trachurus trachurus)  in the bay of Gemlik, Turkey. The body was between 5036 and 10164 µm long and 478 and 878) µm wide. The proboscis was cylindrical, wider anteriorly, between 2310 and 5313 µm long, and armed with 11 or 12 rows of hooks comprising 11 to 13 hooks in each. The anterior hooks were smaller than the posterior, measuring 34 (24 – 42) µm, 42 (40 – 44) µm, to 61 (54 – 70) µm long. The short proboscis sac consisted of two membranes. The lemnisci were level with the proboscis. One immature male sample had two spherical testes, 216 × 272 µm in diameter. The copulatory bursa was 80 by 140 µm. The cement glands were indistinct. The eggs measured between 70 and 210 µm long and 17 and 52 µm wide.

Longicollum psettodesai Gupta & Gupta, 1980
Longicollum quiloni Gupta & Naqvi, 1984
Longicollum riouxi Golvan, 1969

Paralongicollum Amin, Bauer & Sidorov, 1991
Paralongicollum nemacheili Amin, Bauer & Sidorov, 1991
Paralongicollum sergenti (Choquette & Gayot, 1952)
Pomphorhynchus Monticelli, 1905
Pomphorhynchus bosniacus Kistaroly and Cankovic, 1969
Pomphorhynchus bufonis Fotedar, Duda and Raina, 1970
Pomphorhynchus bulbocolli Linkins in Van Cleave, 1919
Pomphorhynchus bullocki Gupta and Lata, 1968
Pomphorhynchus cylindrica Wang and Gu, 1983
Pomphorhynchus dubious Kaw, 1941
Pomphorhynchus francoisae Golvan, 1969
Pomphorhynchus jammuensis Fotedar and Dhar, 1977
Pomphorhynchus kashmirensis Kaw, 1941
Pomphorhynchus kawi Fotedar, Duda and Raina, 1970	
Pomphorhynchus kostylewi Petrochenko, 1956
Pomphorhynchus laevis (Zoega in Müller, 1776)

P. laevis is a parasitic acanthocephalan worm that can influence the reaction of its intermediate host, the freshwater amphipod Gammarus pulex, to the smell of potential predators like perch, Perca fluviatilis.

P. laevis facilitates its movement from its initial host. Research has demonstrated that organisms affected by the parasite exhibit a diminished or inverted avoidance response to the scent of predators when compared to uninfested specimens, supporting the notion that the parasite manipulates its host, with the goal of passing itself on to its definitive host, a freshwater fish. Affected specimens also demonstrate vibrant changes in color, making them more visible to predators.

This worm swells its proboscis to press microneedles into the intestinal wall, with a very strong adhesive force.  This has inspired a structural skin graft adhesive that sticks strongly but has minimal tissue damage while in place and upon removal.

Pomphorhynchus lucyi Williams & Rogers, 1984
Pomphorhynchus megacanthus Fotedar and Dhar, 1977
Pomphorhynchus moyanoi Olmes and Habit, 2007
Pomphorhynchus omarsegundoi Arredondo and Gil de Pertierra, 2010
Pomphorhynchus oreini Fotedar and Dhar, 1977
Pomphorhynchus orientalis Fotedar and Dhar, 1977
Pomphorhynchus patagonicus Ortubay, Ubeda, Semenas and Kennedy, 1991
Pomphorhynchus perforator (von Linstow, 1908)
Pomphorhynchus purhepechus García-Varela, Mendoza-Garfias, Choudhury & Pérez-Ponce de León, 2017
Pomphorhynchus rocci Cordonnier & Ward, 1967
Pomphorhynchus sebastichthydis Yamaguti, 1939
Pomphorhynchus sphaericus Pertierra, Spatz and Doma, 1996
Pomphorhynchus spindletruncatus Amin, Abdullah and Mhaisen, 2003
Pomphorhynchus tereticollis (Rudolphi, 1809)
Pomphorhynchus tori Fotedar and Dhar, 1977
Pomphorhynchus yamagutii Schmidt and Higgins, 1973
Pomphorhynchus yunnanensis Wang, 1981
Pomphorhynchus zhoushanensis Li, Chen, Amin & Yang, 2017

Tenuiproboscis Yamaguti, 1935Tenuiproboscis bilqeesae Gupta & Naqvi, 1992Tenuiproboscis clupei Gupta & Sinha, 1992Tenuiproboscis edmondi Gupta & Naqvi, 1992Tenuiproboscis ernakulensis Gupta & Naqvi, 1992Tenuiproboscis guptai Gupta & Sinha, 1989Tenuiproboscis keralensis Kaur, Shamal, Chandran, Binesh, Gishnu, Asokan & Sanil, 2017Tenuiproboscis meyeri Saxena & Gupta, 2007Tenuiproboscis misgurni''' Yamaguti, 1935

Notes

References

External links
Pomphorhynchidae Yamaguti, 1939 at the World Register of Marine Species web-site

Echinorhynchida
Acanthocephala families